Sara Margery Fry  (11 March 1874 – 21 April 1958) was a British prison reformer as well as one of the first women to become a magistrate. She was the secretary of the Howard League for Penal Reform and the principal of Somerville College, Oxford.

Early life
Fry was born in London in 1874. She was the child of Quakers Sir Edward Fry, a judge, and his wife, Mariabella Hodgkin (1833–1930).  Her siblings included Joan Mary Fry, the social reformer, Roger Fry of the Bloomsbury Group, the biographer and bryologist Agnes Fry and pacifist Anna Ruth Fry. She was home schooled until she was seventeen when she attended Miss Lawrence's school at Brighton before proceeding to study maths at Somerville College, Oxford in 1894. She went home after she graduated but returned to Somerville to become their librarian. 

In 1904, she left Somerville and became Warden of the new women's residence at Birmingham University at an annual salary of £60. It was there that Fry met educationist and fellow relief worker Marjorie Rackstraw, who would become her lifelong friend.

In 1913 her uncle, Joseph Storrs Fry died and left her sufficient money that she left her position at Birmingham in the following year. After 1915, she helped organise Quaker relief efforts in the Marne war area, and then elsewhere in France.

Belief in penal reform
After the First World War, she lived with her brother Roger and began the work on prison reform in which she was to be involved until the end of her life. In 1918, she became secretary of the Penal Reform League, which merged with the Howard Association in 1921 to form the Howard League for Penal Reform; she was secretary of the combined organisation until 1926.  In 1919 she was appointed to the newly founded University Grants Committee on which she served until 1948.  In 1921 she was appointed a magistrate, one of the first women magistrates in Britain. In 1922 she was appointed education advisor to Holloway Prison (a prison for women in London). Margery Fry was Director of the Howard League for Penal Reform from its foundation in 1921 until 1926. She also served as Chair of the league's Council from 1926 to 1929.

She is also known for her opposition to the death penalty and her support of compensation for victims of crimes.

Academic career
Fry studied mathematics at Somerville College, Oxford. She was Librarian at Somerville (1899–1904). In 1904, she became Warden of the women's residence at Birmingham University. 

From 1926 to 1930, she was Principal of Somerville College.  Her appointment was hailed as "[combining] intellectual distinction, a fine eloquence, and academic experience with the force of character and sympathy which the post demands." The Graduate (Middle Common Room, or MCR) accommodation building at Somerville College is called 'Margery Fry House' in her honour.

Somerville College Library holds a collection of her correspondence and papers.

Other
She was also a governor of the BBC from 1937 to 1938 and a participant in The Brains Trust series starting in 1942. The Fry Housing Trust was established in 1959, in memory of Margery Fry. In 1990, the Margery Fry Award was established in her honour.
In the 1940s/1950s she and her sister Ruth lived together in a large Georgian house in Clarendon Road, W11, surrounded by treasures accumulated from around the world.  There they occasionally gave magical tea parties for local children.

References

Bibliography
Margery Fry: The Essential Amateur by Enid Huws Jones, Oxford University Press. 1966.
"Margery Fry", Oxford Dictionary of National Biography. Written by Thomas L. Hodgkin, rev.  Mark Pottle. 
The Politics of Penal Reform: Margery Fry and the Howard League (2017) by Ann Logan

External links
 Fry Housing Trust website
 The official history of Fry's career on the Somerville College website
 Margery Fry, 1874–1958: a lecture given on Friday 5 July 1974, at the University of Birmingham to celebratethe centenary of the birth of Margery Fry, by Janet Vaughan. Published in 1974, Margery Fry Memorial Trust (Birmingham).
 Fry's correspondence and papers are now held by Somerville College library

1874 births
1958 deaths
Academics from London
Margery
People educated at Roedean School, East Sussex
English activists
English women activists
English Quakers
Alumni of Somerville College, Oxford
Fellows of Somerville College, Oxford
Principals of Somerville College, Oxford
English women judges
Prison reformers
British reformers
People associated with the University of Birmingham
BBC Governors
English justices of the peace